Nordenstadt is one of Wiesbaden's eastern suburbs, and was incorporated into the city of Wiesbaden on 1 January 1977.  Its population is 7,829 (2020). It hosted the first corporate headquarters of Daewoo Germany in the early 1990s.

References

Boroughs of Wiesbaden